2 Puerto Ricans, a Blackman and a Dominican was a short-lived house music group featuring David Morales and Robert Clivillés (Puerto Ricans), David Cole (Black), and Chep Nuñez (Dominican). In 1987, they scored a hit in dance clubs with their debut song, "Do It Properly," the only release on Grooveline Records. The track was inspired by Cole and Bruce Forest's DJ sets at New York club Better Days, where they would mix Adonis' "No Way Back" with scratching, other songs, and samples. Cole, Clivillés, and Morales all performed at Better Days (Clivillés and Morales as DJ and Cole as keyboardist) in the late 1980s. The single was released in the UK on the London Records label; it entered the UK singles chart on June 13, 1987, and reached a peak of number 47, remaining in the chart for four weeks. In 1988, Clivillés and Cole recorded a sequel called "So Many Ways (Do It Properly Part II)" with the Brat Pack on Vendetta/A&M Records. "Do It Properly" was covered again by vocalist Deborah Cooper, who later worked with C+C Music Factory, in 1999, for The Collaboration.

In 1989, 2 Puerto Ricans, a Blackman and a Dominican released a single called "Scandalous" on Capitol Records in the United States and on Syncopate (a label of EMI)) in the UK.

Later in 1989, Clivillés and Cole started C+C Music Factory. David Morales had a successful solo career in the 1990s and Chep Nuñez died in 1990. David Cole died in 1995.

References 

American house music groups
Capitol Records artists